The Pioneer Helmet (also known as the Wollaston Helmet or Northamptonshire Helmet) is an Anglo-Saxon boar-crested helmet from the late seventh century found in Wollaston, Northamptonshire, United Kingdom. It was discovered during a March 1997 excavation before the land was to be mined for gravel and was part of the grave of a young man. Other objects in the grave, such as a hanging bowl and a pattern welded sword, suggest that it was the burial mound of a high-status warrior.

The sparsely decorated nature of the helmet, a utilitarian iron fighting piece, belies its rarity. It is one of just six Anglo-Saxon helmets yet discovered, joined by finds from Benty Grange (1848), Sutton Hoo (1939), Coppergate (1982), Shorwell (2004) and Staffordshire (2009); its basic form is nearly identical to that of the richer Coppergate helmet found in York. Like these, the Pioneer Helmet is an example of the "crested helmets" that flourished in England and Scandinavia from the sixth through eleventh centuries.

The distinctive feature of the helmet is the boar mounted atop its crest. Boar-crested helmets are a staple of Anglo-Saxon imagery, evidence of a Germanic tradition in which the boar invoked the protection of the gods. The Pioneer Helmet is one of three—together with the Benty Grange helmet and the detached Guilden Morden boar—known to have survived. These boar crests recall a time when such decoration may have been common; the Anglo-Saxon poem Beowulf, in which boar-adorned helmets are mentioned five times, speaks of a funeral pyre "heaped with boar-shaped helmets forged in gold," forging a link between the warrior hero of legend and the Pioneer Helmet of reality.

The helmet was named after Pioneer Aggregates UK Ltd, who funded its excavation and conservation.

Description

The helmet has the same basic form as the Anglo-Saxon Coppergate helmet, but is a utilitarian piece with little decoration, and is larger, perhaps to allow for additional padding. It originally consisted of an iron skull cap, from which hung two cheek guards. The form of neck protection that the helmet afforded, if any, is uncertain, owing to ploughing damage to the helmet.

The cap of the helmet was constructed from twelve individual components riveted together. The basic form was created by four pieces: a brow band joined by a nose-to-nape band, and, on either side, a lateral band reaching from the side of the brow band to the top of the nose-to-nape band. Four subtriangular infill plates were riveted inside to cover the resulting holes. Finally, three narrow C-sectioned strips were added to provide additional strength, one each running the length of the nose-to-nape and lateral bands. The nasal is not a separate component, but rather is a continuation of the nose-to-nape bands.

Atop the helmet was set the boar. It was affixed to the C-sectioned nose-to-nape strip, and was forged from a single rod of iron. Its back was bent downwards to form the hind legs, while the front of the rod was split, one part bent to form the forelegs, the other part continuing forward to form the boar's snout. Beyond very minor details—the snout was made to be slightly triangular, the hind was somewhat flattened, and slight grooves in the forelegs suggested individual limbs—the boar was not decorated.

Beneath the cap hung two cheek guards. It was curved inward both laterally and longitudinally other than the upper rear edge which was bent outwards, either intentionally to improve the articulation of the joint, or by damage incurred during use. Two strips of metal were then bent in half, with one folded around the brow band and one around the cheek guard, and attached by a single rivet through each. These encased a narrow loop of wire which held the cheek guards to the cap. A single rivet was also attached to the middle of the guard, probably to facilitate the attachment of leather strips used to draw tight the cheek guards.

The form of neck protection on the helmet, if any, is unclear. The bottom of the back of the helmet is largely missing, although the portion that survives appears to have at least two perforations. These would most likely have been used to attach a neck guard, perhaps like the one made of camail on the Coppergate helmet, yet no such remains were found. A series of unexplained iron rods found near the helmet could theoretically have been used as stiffeners for an organic neck guard, such as one made of leather, but such an arrangement has no known parallels; it is instead thought that the rods were more likely belt stiffeners.

Discovery
The helmet was discovered over Easter in March 1997 in Wollaston, near Wellingborough, Northamptonshire. Excavations in the area had taken place for years on behalf of various aggregate companies before the land was exploited for gravel, and had uncovered an extensive network of Iron Age and Roman farms. The evidence for post-Roman habitation, however, had been limited to two fragments of a brooch, and two separate collections of pottery, when metal detector surveying discovered a copper alloy hanging bowl and a millefiori-decorated mount in what turned out to be a grave. The hanging bowl was detected by Steve Critchley, working alongside the archaeologist Ian Meadows. Meadows immediately recognised the bowl for what it was, and began an excavation.

It was only  from a main contemporary roadway and was likely intended to have been seen by those passing by. Various artefacts were therefore damaged, and any originally placed higher in the grave, such as a shield or spearheads, may have been completely destroyed. The grave was excavated with brushes and wooden tools, revealing a number of bone fragments, including part of a skull; these were used to suggest that the body was that of a man seventeen to twenty-five years old, laid in a supine position with his head on a pillow and knees slightly raised. Also found were three iron buckles, a small iron knife, a small copper alloy hook, and a series of iron rods of unknown function. A pattern welded sword was also found, and together with the hanging bowl and helmet, marks the grave as one for a person of high social status.

The helmet lay next to where the left hip of the body would have rested. It was on its sinister side, with almost the entirety of the dexter side lost through ploughing. Prior to its deposition the nasal had been bent inwards, fracturing the metal, perhaps in a "ritual killing" of the object; a custom known to many cultures, including Anglo-Saxons and Vikings, the practice involves the deliberate breaking of objects before burial for reasons ranging from the releasing of an object's spirit, to the deterrence of grave robbing. When found it was at first thought to be a bucket. Archaeologists covered it in cling film, then wrapped it in plaster of Paris bandages and raised it in a soil block. This was taken to the conservation laboratory at the Newarke Houses Museum in Leicester, where it was analysed, and later conserved, by Anthony "Rolly" Read. The plaster-covered soil block was first x-rayed, revealing the boar-crested helmet within.

The remaining half of the helmet was broken into many pieces—between 100 and 200 overall—including some which were deposited within the helmet itself. These fragments were reassembled using the cellulose nitrate adhesive HMG; the surviving cheek guard, alone, was reassembled from eighteen fragments. The helmet was then dried out and taken to the Leicester General Hospital, where it was subjected to digital x-rays and CT scans. Using this information it was then cleaned, and samples of organic materials—principally textiles and leather, perhaps from the helmet's lining, as well as possible feathers on the brow band—were taken. It was then reassembled into seven larger parts, cleaned again, and finally reconstructed into one piece. Missing sections within the remaining half were then filled in and painted, and in the last step, the boar was affixed to the apex using epoxy. Newspapers as far away as Australia and New Zealand published accounts of the discovery in April, hailing it as "the find of the decade". The helmet was placed on public display on 23 December 1997.

The Wollaston burial was on private land owned by Peter Gammidge and John Minney, and the helmet is now owned by Gammidge and the family of the late Minney. It was termed the "Pioneer Helmet" after Pioneer Aggregates UK Ltd (now owned by Hanson), who fully funded the conservation, and who had over time spent more than £400,000 funding archaeology in the area. The helmet was displayed until March 1998 at the New Walk Museum in Leicester, the site of its unveiling. Currently it is on display at the Royal Armouries Museum in Leeds, West Yorkshire.

Typology

The Pioneer Helmet is dated to the late seventh century on the basis of the style of belt buckles found in the grave, which were current around 675. This suggests a terminus post quem (earliest possible date) for the burial, although not necessarily the helmet's exact date of manufacture or deposition. It is of Anglo-Saxon origin, one of only six such helmets known along with those from Benty Grange, Sutton Hoo, York, Shorwell, and Staffordshire. Like these examples—with the exception of the Frankish Shorwell helmet—the Pioneer Helmet is broadly classed as one of the "crested helmets" known in Northern Europe in the sixth through eleventh centuries AD. These are each characterised by a rounded cap and usually a prominent nose-to-nape crest. Except for an outlier fragment found in Kyiv, all crested helmets originate from England or Scandinavia, and are distinct from the continental spangenhelm and lamellenhelm from the same period.

Notes

References

Bibliography
 
  
 
Old English quotations above use the Klaeber text, published as  
  
 
  
 
  
 
  
 Images on plate XIV

Further reading
 

7th-century works
1997 archaeological discoveries
Anglo-Saxon archaeology
Beowulf
Boars in heraldry
Individual helmets
Military history of Northamptonshire
Pigs in art